

Wilhelm Philipps (29 July 1894 – 13 February 1971) was a German general in the Wehrmacht during World War II. He was a recipient of the Knight's Cross of the Iron Cross of Nazi Germany.

Awards 

 Knight's Cross of the Iron Cross on 5 March 1945 as Generalleutnant and commander of 3. Panzer-Division

References

Citations

Bibliography

 

1894 births
1971 deaths
Military personnel from Wuppertal
Lieutenant generals of the German Army (Wehrmacht)
German Army personnel of World War I
Recipients of the clasp to the Iron Cross, 1st class
Recipients of the Gold German Cross
Recipients of the Knight's Cross of the Iron Cross
German prisoners of war in World War II
People from the Rhine Province
German Army generals of World War II